The yellow-bellied prinia (Prinia flaviventris) is a species of bird in the family Cisticolidae.
It is found in Pakistan, the southern Himalayan foothills, the northeastern Indian subcontinent, and Southeast Asia.

Gallery

References

yellow-bellied prinia
Birds of Pakistan
Birds of the Himalayas
Birds of Bangladesh
Birds of Northeast India
Birds of Southeast Asia
yellow-bellied prinia
Taxonomy articles created by Polbot